Lesterville Township is an inactive township in Reynolds County, in the U.S. state of Missouri.

Lesterville Township was erected in 1872, taking its name from the community of Lesterville, Missouri.

References

Townships in Missouri
Townships in Reynolds County, Missouri